English writer Mary Adelaide Walker published four books detailing her travels in the Balkans during the second half of the nineteenth century. Her books provide detailed descriptions of Southeastern European and Western Asian cultures from her own perspective as an English traveler. Among the places she describes are Romania, Greece, Albania, Turkey, Bulgaria, and Macedonia. In her books, Walker also included original illustrations of the people and places she saw on her travels.

Some scholars estimate that she lived away from England for about 40 years after joining her brother, a British chaplain, in Istanbul in approximately 1856.

List of works 

 Eastern Life and Scenery, With Excursions in Asia Minor, Mytilene, Crete, and Roumania (1886; published in two volumes)
 Old Tracks and New Landmarks: Wayside Sketches in Crete, Macedonia, Mitylene, etc. (1897)
 Through Macedonia to the Albanian Lakes (1864)
 Untrodden Paths in Roumania (1888)

References

English travel writers
19th-century English women writers